The 22nd Special Tactics Squadron is a Special Tactics unit of the United States Air Force Special Operations Command, based at Joint Base Lewis–McChord.

Constituted and activated in 1984 as the 1722nd Combat Control Squadron at McChord Air Force Base (later Joint Base Lewis–McChord), it participated in Operation Just Cause and the Gulf War. The squadron was redesignated the 62nd Combat Control Squadron in 1992 and the 22nd Special Tactics Squadron in 1996, when it became part of the 720th Special Tactics Group in 1996. The 22nd STS has fought in the War in Afghanistan and the Iraq War.

History 
The 1722d Combat Control Squadron was constituted and activated on 1 July 1984 at McChord Air Force Base, assigned to the Twenty-Second Air Force. It fought in Operation Just Cause, the United States invasion of Panama, in December 1989 and January 1990. From 17 January to 11 April 1991, the 1722d fought in Operation Desert Storm, the liberation of Kuwait during the Gulf War. On 1 March it became part of the 1725th Combat Control Group. The squadron became part of the 62d Operations Group on 1 June 1992 and was redesignated the 62d Combat Control Squadron.

On 1 May 1996, the squadron was redesignated the 22d Special Tactics Squadron and became part of the 720th Special Tactics Group. The squadron fought in the War in Afghanistan and the Iraq War. For actions in deployments to Afghanistan in 2006 and 2007, Combat Controllers Technical Sergeant Scott Innis and Staff Sergeants Sean Harvell and Evan Jones were awarded the Silver Star. On 23 January 2013, Combat Controller Staff Sergeant Adam Krueger was awarded the Silver Star for calling in airstrikes on insurgents in Afghanistan while under fire.

In June 2014, Lieutenant Colonel Michael Evancic took command of the squadron, replacing Colonel Thad Allen. Between 14 and 15 July it participated in exercises with the 160th Special Operations Aviation Regiment. Combat Controller Technical Sergeant Matthew McKenna was awarded the Silver Star on 18 August for coordinating airstrikes on insurgents in Afghanistan while under fire. On 17 December pararescueman Master Sergeant Ivan Ruiz was awarded the Air Force Cross for saving the lives of two wounded Army Special Forces teammates on 10 December 2013 while deployed to Kandahar Province in Afghanistan with the 22nd STS. In 2015 the squadron was involved in airfield assessment missions in Africa. On 16 November 2016, Combat Controller Staff Sergeant Keaton Thiem was awarded the Silver Star for coordinating airstrikes under enemy fire on 22 February of that year in Parwan Province.  As of August 2017 it was commanded by Lieutenant Colonel Daniel Magruder.

Lineage 
 Constituted as 1722d Combat Control Squadron and activated on 1 July 1984
 Redesignated 62d Combat Control Squadron on 1 June 1992
 Redesignated 22d Special Tactics Squadron on 1 May 1996

Assignments 
 Twenty-Second Air Force, 1 July 1984
 1725th Combat Control Group, 1 March 1991
 62d Operations Group, 1 June 1992
 720th Special Tactics Group, 1 May 1996–present

Stations 
 McChord Air Force Base (later Joint Base Lewis–McChord), 1 July 1984–present

Awards and campaigns

References

External links 

 
 

Special tactics squadrons of the United States Air Force
Military units and formations in Washington (state)